The Canary Islands requires its residents to register their motor vehicles and display vehicle registration plates. Current plates are European standard 520 mm × 110 mm, and use Spanish stamping dies.

References

Canary Islands
Transport in the Canary Islands
Canary Islands-related lists